Pamela Carroll Bricker (July 7, 1954 – February 20, 2005) was a jazz singer and professor of music at George Washington University. She was a frequent collaborator and guest vocalist with the group Thievery Corporation, and the voice on their track "Lebanese Blonde", which was popularized by its inclusion on Zach Braff's Garden State soundtrack. She was also a member of Mad Romance vocal quartet from 1983–1989. Bricker was frequently nominated for Washington Area Music Association (WAMA) honors and won as best contemporary jazz vocalist in 1999, 2000 and 2001, and best contemporary jazz album in 2001 for U-topia.

In 2005, Bricker committed suicide by hanging. On May 2, 2006, Thievery Corporation released one of Pam's last recordings, "The Passing Stars", on iTunes to raise money for Chernobyl Children's Project International and Children of Chernobyl Relief and Development Fund. In 2007, Bricker was given WAMA's "Special Appreciation" award. Her long-time musical partner, Wayne Wilentz (with whom she recorded U-Topia), presented the award.

References

External links 
 Official site
 

1954 births
2005 suicides
American jazz singers
American women jazz singers
Suicides by hanging in Maryland
20th-century American singers
American electronic musicians
American women in electronic music
20th-century American women singers
2005 deaths
21st-century American women